The Chief of Joint Operations (CJO) (C INSATS, sometimes as Insatschefen or Chefen för insatsledningen, C INS) is a three-star role within the Swedish Armed Forces, responsible the Joint Forces Command (JFC). The Chief of Defence Staff is part of the Defence Board (Försvarsmaktsledningen, FML), a group of the Supreme Commander's top commanders.

Organisation
At the Swedish Armed Forces Headquarters's reorganization on 1 April 2007, the Joint Forces Command (JFC) (Insatsledningen, INS) was created. It commands the Swedish Armed Forces' missions on behalf of the Supreme Commander. Its assignment is to plan, command and follow up missions, both in Sweden and abroad. The Joint Forces Command is responsible for the Swedish Armed Forces' missions. This may involve, for example, international peacekeeping or peace enforcement missions, or detecting and rejecting aircraft or vessels that violate Swedish territory. The Joint Forces Command uses intelligence from the Swedish Military Intelligence and Security Service, to make their decisions. The Chief of Joint Operations reports directly to the Supreme Commander. Sorting under the Chief of Joint Operations are a number of commanders with different responsibilities. The tasks of the commanders are, among other things, to command, plan and follow up missions and to support the Swedish society. War units are military units that are prepared to carry out operations and which are part of any of the Swedish Armed Forces' units, schools or centers. Responsibility is divided between the tactical commanders, the ground, naval and air forces, as well as the head of the Special Forces Command (SFL).

Heraldry
The command flag of the Chief of Joint Operations was previously used by the Chief of the Joint Forces Command. The command flag is drawn by Kristina Holmgård-Åkerberg and embroidered by hand in insertion technique by MajBritt Salander/firma Blå Kusten. Blazon: "Fessed in blue and yellow; on blue, three yellow open crowns placed two and one, on yellow a blue sword sinister and a blue baton of command with four sets of open yellow crowns placed two and one in saltire".

Chiefs of Joint Operations

Deputy Chiefs of Joint Operations

Footnotes

References

Notes

Print

Military appointments of Sweden